R (on the application of Playfoot) v Millais School Governing Body [2007] EWHC 1698 (Admin) is an English discrimination law case concerning freedom of religion. It was decided under the Human Rights Act 1998.

Facts
A girl insisted that wearing a purity ring at school was a manifestation of her religious beliefs as a Christian. Her school had a policy against jewellery, and she was told she was not allowed to wear it. She claimed that it violated her right to freedom of religion, under Art.9 ECHR. She was represented by Paul Diamond.

Judgment
Michael Supperstone QC held in the Administrative Court that not only was the wearing of the ring not linked to a belief in chastity before marriage, but that it was not any requirement of the Christian faith. The uniform policy, which she had accepted by going to the school, did not create any undue hardship. The policy was prescribed by law in the legitimate pursuit of creating equality and cohesion, minimising pressure from markings of difference in wealth or status. So any interference with her Art.9 rights was justified.

See also
UK employment discrimination law
UK labour law
Human Rights Act 1998

Notes

United Kingdom labour case law
Anti-discrimination law in the United Kingdom
Human rights in England
High Court of Justice cases
2007 in case law
2007 in England
2007 in British law